is a TV sportscaster and presenter on the J-Wave radio station in Japan.

Oh is the second daughter of former baseball player and Fukuoka SoftBank Hawks team manager Sadaharu Oh. She graduated from Aoyama Gakuin University in Tokyo, and is also qualified as a "Junior vegetable and fruit meister" or "Vegetable sommelier". She worked for the Hakuhodo advertising agency before moving to TV in 1996.

Rie Oh holds Taiwanese citizenship because her father did not want his daughters to become naturalized Japanese, although neither could speak Chinese.

Personal life
Previously married twice, Oh was engaged to marry psychiatrist Masaki Honda in January 2008, but subsequently broke off the engagement. Honda was the personal doctor to sumo yokozuna Asashoryu.

TV commercials
 Oligo no kage (2007–)
 House Hokkaido Stew (2007)

References

External links
 Official website 
 Official blog 

Aoyama Gakuin University alumni
1970 births
Living people
Japanese sports announcers
Taiwanese expatriates in Japan